The Deregulation Act 2015 (c. 20) is an Act of Parliament in the United Kingdom. It is

An Act to make provision for the reduction of burdens resulting from legislation for businesses or other organisations or for individuals; make provision for the repeal of legislation which no longer has practical use; make provision about the exercise of regulatory functions; and for connected purposes.

One notable piece of legislation that was introduced is aimed at countering retaliatory evictions (e.g. following a complaint by a tenant to a landlord about the condition of the rented property) and imposes new obligations on landlords if they are to serve a valid section 21 notice.

See also
Landlord–tenant law
Deregulation

References

 

English law
United Kingdom Acts of Parliament 2015